Rhetenor is a genus of beetle mimicking jumping spiders that was first described by Eugène Louis Simon in 1902.  it contains only two species, found only in the United States and Brazil: R. diversipes and R. texanus. The name is a reference to Rhetnor, a character in Ovid's Metamorphoses.

References

External links
 Painting of Rhetenor sp.

Salticidae genera
Salticidae
Spiders of Brazil
Spiders of the United States